The Urstrom is a geologists' name for a great glacial age river of the Polish and north German plain, which drained the combined melt-waters from the northern headwaters of the Alps and the southern part of the Scandinavian ice during the Devensian ice age.

See also 
 Urstromtal

References

Ice ages
Rivers of Poland
Paleogeography